The history of union busting in the United States dates back to the Industrial Revolution in the 19th century.  The Industrial Revolution produced a rapid expansion in factories and manufacturing capabilities. As workers moved from farms to factories, mines and other hard labor, they faced harsh working conditions such as long hours, low pay and health risks. Children and women worked in factories and generally received lower pay than men. The government did little to limit these conditions.  Labor movements in the industrialized world developed and lobbied for better rights and safer conditions.  Shaped by wars, depressions, government policies, judicial rulings, and global competition, the early years of the battleground between unions and management were adversarial and often identified with aggressive hostility.  Contemporary opposition to trade unions known as union busting started in the 1940s, and continues to present challenges to the labor movement. Union busting is a term used by labor organizations and trade unions to describe the activities that may be undertaken by  employers, their proxies, workers and in certain instances states and governments usually triggered by events such as picketing, card check, worker organizing, and strike actions.  Labor legislation has changed the nature of union busting, as well as the organizing tactics that labor organizations commonly use.

Strike breaking and union busting, 1870s–1935 
Hiring agencies specialising in anti-union practices has been an option available to employers from the bloody strikes of the last quarter of the nineteenth century, until today.

Working with owner John D. Rockefeller, Charles Pratt's Astral Oil Works in 1874 began to buy refineries in Brooklyn to decrease competition. Around this time, the coopers' union opposed Pratt's efforts to cut back on certain manual operations, as they were the craftsmen who made the barrels that held the oil. Pratt busted the union, and his strategies for breaking up the organization were adopted by other refineries.

Creative methods of union busting have been around for a long time. In 1907, Morris Friedman reported that a Pinkerton agent who had infiltrated the Western Federation of Miners managed to gain control of a strike relief fund, and attempted to exhaust that union's treasury by awarding lavish benefits to strikers. However, many attacks against unions have used force of one sort or another, including police action, military force, or recruiting goon squads.

Physical attacks against unions
Unions such as the Industrial Workers of the World (IWW) were devastated by the Palmer Raids, carried out as part of the First Red Scare. The Everett Massacre (also known as Bloody Sunday) was an armed confrontation between local authorities and IWW members which took place in Everett, Washington on Sunday, November 5, 1916. Later, communist-led unions were isolated or destroyed and their activists purged with the assistance of other union organizations during the Second Red Scare.

In May 1886 the Knights of Labor were demonstrating in the Haymarket Square in Chicago, demanding an eight-hour day in all trades. When police arrived, an unknown person threw a bomb into the crowd, killing one person and injuring several others. "In a trial marked by prejudice and hysteria" a court sentenced seven anarchists, six of them German-speaking, to death - with no evidence linking them to the bomb.

Strikes also took place that same month (May 1886) in other cities, including in Milwaukee, where seven people died when Wisconsin Governor Jeremiah M. Rusk ordered state-militia troops to fire upon thousands of striking workers who had marched to the Milwaukee Iron Works Rolling Mill in Bay View, on Milwaukee's south side.

In 1914 one of the most bitter labor conflicts in American history took place at a mining colony in Colorado called Ludlow. After workers went on strike in September 1913 with grievances ranging from requests for an eight-hour day to allegations of subjugation, Colorado governor Elias Ammons called in the National Guard in October 1913. That winter, Guardsmen made 172 arrests.

The strikers began to fight back, killing four mine guards and firing into a separate camp where strikebreakers lived. When the body of a strikebreaker was found nearby, the National Guard's General Chase ordered the tent colony destroyed in retaliation.

"On Monday morning, April 20, two dynamite bombs were exploded, in the hills above Ludlow ... a signal for operations to begin. At 9 am a machine gun began firing into the tents [where strikers were living], and then others joined." One eyewitness reported: "The soldiers and mine guards tried to kill everybody; anything they saw move". That night the National Guard rode down from the hills surrounding Ludlow and set fire to the tents. Twenty-six people, including two women and eleven children, were killed.

Union busting with police and military force
For approximately 150 years, union organizing efforts and strikes have been periodically opposed by police, security forces, National Guard units, special police forces such as the Coal and Iron Police, and/or use of the United States Army. Significant incidents have included the Haymarket Riot and the Ludlow massacre. The Homestead struggle of 1892, the Pullman walkout of 1894, and the Colorado Labor Wars of 1903 are examples of unions destroyed or significantly damaged by the deployment of military force. In all three examples, a strike became the triggering event.

Pinkertons and militia at Homestead, 1892 - One of the first union busting agencies was the Pinkerton National Detective Agency, which came to public attention as the result of a shooting war that broke out between strikers and three hundred Pinkerton agents during the Homestead Strike of 1892. When the Pinkerton agents were withdrawn, state militia forces were deployed. The militia repulsed attacks on the steel plant, and prevented violence against strikebreakers crossing picket lines, causing a decisive defeat of the strike, and ended the power of the Amalgamated Association of Iron and Steel Workers at the Homestead plant.
Federal troops end the railroad blockades by the American Railway Union, 1894 - During the Pullman Strike, the American Railway Union (ARU), out of union solidarity, called out its members according to the principle of industrial unionism. Their actions in blocking the movement of railroad trains were illegal but successful, until twenty thousand federal troops were called out to ensure that trains carrying US mail could travel freely. Once the trains ran, the strike ended.
National Guard in the Colorado Labor Wars, 1903 - The Colorado National Guard, an employers' organization called the Citizens' Alliance, and the Mine Owners' Association teamed together to eject the Western Federation of Miners from mining camps throughout Colorado during the Colorado Labor Wars.

Anatomy of a corporate union buster

Corporations Auxiliary Company, a union buster during the first half of the 20th century, would tell employers,

Our man will come to your factory and get acquainted... If he finds little disposition to organize, he will not encourage organization, but will engineer things so as to keep organization out. If, however, there seems a disposition to organize he will become the leading spirit and pick out just the right men to join. Once the union is in the field its members can keep it from growing if they know how, and our man knows how. Meetings can be set far apart. A contract can at once be entered into with the employer, covering a long period, and made very easy in its terms. However, these tactics may not be good, and the union spirit may be so strong that a big organization cannot be prevented. In this case our man turns extremely radical. He asks for unreasonable things and keeps the union embroiled in trouble. If a strike comes, he will be the loudest man in the bunch, and will counsel violence and get somebody in trouble. The result will be that the union will be broken up. 

In the period 1933 to 1936, Corporations Auxiliary Company had 499 corporate clients.

College students as strikebreakers in the Interborough Rapid Transit strike of 1905
Following a walk out of subway workers, management of the trains  Interborough Rapid Transit in New York City appealed to university students to volunteer as motormen, conductors, ticket sellers and ticket choppers. Stephen Norword discusses the phenomenon of students as strikebreakers in early 20th Century North America: "Throughout the period between 1901 and 1923, college students represented a major, and often critically important source of strikebreakers in a wide range of industries and services. ... Collegians deliberately volunteered their services as strikebreakers and were the group least likely to be swayed by the pleas of strikers and their sympathizers that they were doing something wrong."

Jack Whitehead, the first "King of Strike Breakers"
There were a significant number of strikes during the 1890s and very early 1900s. Strikebreaking by recruiting massive numbers of replacement workers became a significant activity.

Jack Whitehead saw opportunity in labor struggles; while other workers were attempting to organize unions, he walked away from his union to organize an army of strikebreakers. Whitehead was the first to be called "King of the Strike Breakers"; by deploying his private workforce during strikes of steelworkers in Pittsburgh, Pennsylvania, and Birmingham, Alabama, he became wealthy. By demonstrating how lucrative strikebreaking could be, Whitehead inspired a host of imitators.

James Farley inherits the strikebreaker title
After Whitehead, men like James A. Farley and Pearl Bergoff turned union busting into a substantial industry. Farley began his strikebreaking career in 1895, and opened a detective agency in New York City in 1902. In addition to detective work, Farley accepted industrial assignments, specializing in breaking strikes of streetcar drivers. Farley hired his men based in part upon courage and toughness, and in some strikes they openly carried firearms. They were paid more than the strikers had been. Farley was credited with a string of successful strikebreaking actions, employing hundreds, and sometimes thousands of strikebreakers. Farley was sometimes paid as much as three hundred thousand dollars for breaking a strike, and by 1914 he had taken in more than ten million dollars. Farley claimed that he had defeated thirty-five strikes in a row. But he suffered from tuberculosis, and as he faced death, he declared that he turned down the job of breaking a streetcar strike in Philadelphia because this time, "the strikers were in the right."

Bergoff Brothers Strike Service and Labor Adjusters
Pearl Bergoff also began his strikebreaking career in New York City, working as a spotter on the Metropolitan Street Railway in Manhattan. His job was to watch conductors, making certain that they recorded all of the fares that they accepted. In 1905 Bergoff started the Vigilant Detective Agency of New York City. Within two years his brothers joined the lucrative business, and the name was changed to the Bergoff Brothers Strike Service and Labor Adjusters. Bergoff's early strikebreaking actions were characterized by extreme violence. A 1907 strike of garbage cart drivers resulted in numerous confrontations between strikers and the strikebreakers, even when protected by police escorts. Strikers sometimes pelted the strikebreakers with rocks, bottles, and bricks launched from tenement rooftops.

In 1909, the Pressed Steel Car Company at McKees Rocks, Pennsylvania fired forty men, and eight thousand employees walked out under the banner of the Industrial Workers of the World. Bergoff's agency hired strikebreaking toughs from the Bowery, and shipped vessels filled with unsuspecting immigrant workers directly into the strike zone. Other immigrant strikebreakers were delivered in boxcars, and were not fed during a two-day period. Later they worked, ate, and slept in a barn with two thousand other men. Their meals consisted of cabbage and bread.

There were violent confrontations between strikers and strikebreakers, but also between strikebreakers and guards when the terrified workers demanded the right to leave. An Austro-Hungarian immigrant who managed to escape told his government that workers were being held against their will, resulting in an international incident. In addition to kidnapping, strikebreakers complained of deception, broken promises about wages, and tainted food.

During federal hearings, Bergoff explained that "musclemen" under his employ would "get... any graft that goes on", suggesting that was to be expected "on every big job". Other testimony indicated that Bergoff's "right-hand man", described as "huge in stature, weighing perhaps 240 pounds", surrounded himself with thirty-five guards who intimidated and fleeced the strikebreakers, locking them into a boxcar prison with no sanitation facilities when they defied orders.

At the end of August a gun battle erupted, leaving six dead, six dying, and fifty wounded. Public sympathy began to swing away from the company, and toward the strikers. Early in September the company acknowledged defeat and negotiated with the strikers. Twenty-two had died in the strike. But Bergoff's business was not hurt by the defeat; he boasted of having as many as ten thousand strikebreakers on his payroll. He was getting paid as much as two million dollars per strikebreaking job.

Anti-union vigilantes during the First Red Scare
Unlike the American Federation of Labor, the Industrial Workers of the World opposed the First World War. The American Protective League (APL) was a pro-war organization formed by wealthy Chicago businessmen. At the height of its power the APL had 250,000 members in 600 cities. In 1918, documents from the APL showed that ten percent of its efforts (the largest of any category) were focused on disrupting the activities of the IWW. The APL burgled and vandalized IWW offices, and harassed IWW members. Such actions were illegal, yet were supported by the Wilson administration.

Spies, "missionaries", and saboteurs
Strikebreaking by hiring massive numbers of tough opportunists began to lose favor in the 1920s; there were fewer strikes, resulting in fewer opportunities. By the 1930s, agencies began to rely more upon the use of informants and labor spies.

Spy agencies hired to bust unions developed a level of sophistication that could devastate targets. "Missionaries" were undercover operatives trained to use whispering campaigns or unfounded rumors to create dissension on the picket lines and in union halls. The strikers themselves were not the only targets. For example, female missionaries might systematically visit the strikers' wives in the home, relating a sob story of how a strike had destroyed their own families. Missionary campaigns have been known to destroy not only strikes, but unions themselves.

In the 1930s, the Pinkerton Agency employed twelve hundred labor spies, and nearly one-third of them held high level positions in the targeted unions. The International Association of Machinists was damaged when Sam Brady, a veteran Pinkerton operative, held a high enough position in that union that he was able to precipitate a premature strike. All but five officers in a United Auto Workers local in Lansing, Michigan were driven out by Pinkerton agents. The five who remained were Pinkertons. At the Underwood Elliott-Fisher Company plant, the union local was so badly injured by undercover operatives that membership dropped from more than twenty five hundred to fewer than seventy-five.

General strikebreaking methods

During the period from roughly 1910 to 1914, Robert Hoxie compiled a list of methods used by employers' associations to attack unions. The list was published in 1921, as part of the book Trade Unionism in the United States.  These methods include counter organization, inducing union leaders to support management, supporting other pro-business enterprises, refusing to work with pro-union enterprises, obtaining information on unions among others.

Hoxie summarized the underlying theories, assumptions, and attitudes of employers' associations of the period. According to Hoxie, these included the supposition that employers' interests are always identical to society's interests, such that unions should be condemned when they interfere; that the employers' interests are always harmonious with the workers' interests, and unions therefore try to mislead workers; that workers should be grateful to employers, and are therefore ungrateful and immoral when they join unions; that the business is solely the employer's to manage; that unions are operated by non-employees, and they are therefore necessarily outsiders; that unions restrict the right of employees to work when, where, and how they wish; and that the law, the courts, and the police represent absolute and impartial rights and justice, and therefore unions are to be condemned when they violate the law or oppose the police.

Given the proliferation of employers' associations created primarily for the purpose of opposing unions, Hoxie poses counter-questions. For example, if every employer has a right to manage his own business without interference from outside workers, then why hasn't a group of workers at a particular company the right to manage their own affairs without interference from outside employers?

Strikebreaking and union busting, 1936–1947
Employers in the United States have had the legal right to permanently replace economic strikers since the Supreme Court's 1937 decision in NLRB v. Mackay Radio & Telegraph Co.

Meanwhile, employers began to demand more subtle and sophisticated union busting tactics, and so the field called "preventive labor relations" was born. The new practitioners were armed with degrees in industrial psychology, management, and labor law. They would use these skills not only to manipulate the provisions of national labor law, but also the emotions of workers seeking to unionize.

Nathan Shefferman (Labor Relations Associates), 1940s–1950s
After passage of the Wagner Act in 1935, the first nationally known union busting agency was Labor Relations Associates of Chicago, Inc. (LRA) founded in 1939 by Nathan Shefferman, who later in 1961 wrote The Man in the Middle, a guide to union busting, and has been considered the 'founding father' of the modern union avoidance industry. Shefferman had been a member of the original NLRB, and became director of employee relations at Chicago-based Sears, Roebuck and Company. Sears had been engaged in blocking unions from the AFL Retail Clerks union  throughout the 1930s.  Sears provided $10,000 seed money to launch LRA.  In 1957 during hearings conducted by the United States, Congress, and Select Committees on Improper Activities in the Labor and Management Field.  Nate Shefferman was questioned by Robert Kennedy and testimony revealed that Teamsters union "top brass" were regularly sent to meet with him.  An article written by Victor Riesel for Inside Labor on May 28, 1957  reveals that Dave Beck, President of the Teamster's Union in that era, worked closely with Nate Shefferman on many deals not the least of which may have been his influence at Sears to discourage employees from joining the AFL Retail Clerks union which was trying to raid the Teamsters membership to join them instead.  An indicator of the close relationship between the Teamster's President David Beck and Shefferman (excerpted from the article):  "Beck dispatched Shefferman to Jim Hoffa last year (1956) to offer Hoffa the union's presidency if Hoffa would first help re-elect Beck and then wait 6 months for Beck to resign on grounds of ill health".  The article asks "Why did Beck and the multi-million dollar Shefferman work so closely—and on what?"

By the late 1940s, LRA had nearly 400 clients. Shefferman's operatives set up anti-union employee groups called "Vote No" committees, developed ruses to identify pro-union workers, and helped arrange sweetheart contracts with unions that would not challenge management. Consultants from LRA "committed numerous illegal actions, including bribery, coercion of employees and racketeering."

Shefferman built "a daunting business on a foundation of false premises", of which "perhaps the most incredible—and most widely believed—is the myth that companies are at a disadvantage to unions organizationally, legally, and financially during a union-organizing drive." What businesses sought to accomplish through such propaganda was for Congress to amend the Wagner Act.

One of Shefferman's associates defined his technique simply by saying: "We operate the exact way a union does," he said. "But on management's side. We give out leaflets, talk to employees, and organize a propaganda campaign."

Strikebreaking and union busting, 1948–1959

In 1956, Nathan Shefferman defeated a unionizing effort of the Retail Clerks Union at seven Boston-area stores by employing tactics that Walter Tudor, the Sears vice-president for personnel, described as "inexcusable, unnecessary and disgraceful". At a Marion, Ohio, Whirlpool plant, an LRA operative created a card file system which tracked employees' feelings about unions. Many of those he regarded as pro-union were fired. A similar practice took place at the Morton Frozen Foods plant in Webster City, Iowa. An employee recruited by LRA operatives wrote down a list of employees thought to favor a union. Management fired those workers. The list-making employee received a substantial pay increase. When the United Packinghouse Workers of America union was defeated, Shefferman arranged a sweetheart contract with a union that Morton Frozen Foods controlled, with no participation from the workers. From 1949 through 1956, LRA earned nearly $2.5 million providing such anti-union services.

In 1957, the United States Senate Select Committee on Improper Activities in Labor and Management (also known as the McClellan Committee) investigated unions for corruption, and employers and agencies for union busting activities. Labor Relations Associates was found to have committed violations of the National Labor Relations Act of 1935, including manipulating union elections through bribery and coercion, threatening to revoke workers' benefits if they organized, installing union officers who were sympathetic to management, rewarding employees who worked against the union, and spying on and harassing workers. The McClellan Committee believed that "the National Labor Relations Board [was] impotent to deal with Shefferman's type of activity."

Post-1960s

There is little evidence that employers availed themselves of anti-union services during the 1960s or the early 1970s. However, under a new reading of the Landrum-Griffin Act, the Department of Labor took action against consulting agencies related to filing of required reports in only three cases after 1966, and between 1968 and 1974 it filed no actions at all. By the late 1970s, consulting agencies had stopped filing reports.

The 1970s and 1980s were an altogether more hostile political and economic climate for organized labor. Meanwhile, a new multi-billion dollar union buster industry, using industrial psychologists, lawyers, and strike management experts, proved skilled at sidestepping requirements of both the National Labor Relations Act and Landrum-Griffin in the war against labor unions. In the 1970s the number of consultants, and the scope and sophistication of their activities, increased substantially. As the numbers of consultants increased, the numbers of unions suffering NLRB setbacks also increased. Labor's percentage of election wins slipped from 57 percent to 46 percent. The number of union decertification elections tripled, with a 73 percent loss rate for unions. The political environment has included the National Labor Relations Board and the U.S. Department of Labor failing to enforce the law against companies that repeatedly violate labor law.

Labor relations consulting firms began providing seminars on union avoidance strategies in the 1970s. Agencies moved from subverting unions to screening out union sympathizers during hiring, indoctrinating workforces, and propagandizing against unions.

By the mid-1980s, Congress had investigated, but failed to regulate, abuses by labor relations consulting firms. Meanwhile, while some anti-union employers continued to rely upon the tactics of persuasion and manipulation, other besieged firms launched blatantly aggressive anti-union campaigns. At the dawn of the 21st Century, methods of union busting have recalled similar tactics from the dawn of the 20th Century. The political environment has included the National Labor Relations Board and the U.S. Department of Labor failing to enforce the labor law against companies that repeatedly violate it. 

Case Farms built its business by recruiting immigrant workers from Guatemala, who endure conditions few Americans would put up with.
From 1960 to 2000 the percentage of workers in the United States belonging to a labor union fell from 30% to 13%, almost all of that decline being in the private sector.<ref>Winner-Take-All Politics: How Washington Made the Rich Richer--and Turned Its Back on the Middle Class, Jacob S. Hacker and Paul Pierson, Figure 5, p.61. Sources: David Card, Thomas Lemieux, and W. Craig Riddell, `Unions and Wage Inequality`, Journal of Labor Research 25. n.4 (2004): 519-59; Sylvia Allegreto, Lawrence Mishel, and Jard Bernstein, The State of Working America Ithaca, NY: Cornell University Press, 2008</ref>  This is despite an increase in workers expressing an interest in belonging to unions since the early 1980s. (In 2005, more than half of unionized private-sector workers said they wanted a union in their workplace, up from around 30% in 1984.)  According to one source—Winner-Take-All Politics: How Washington Made the Rich Richer—and Turned Its Back on the Middle Class, Jacob S. Hacker and Paul Pierson—a change in the political climate in Washington DC starting in the late 1970s "sidelined" the National Labor Relations Act (NLRA). Much more aggressive and effective business lobbying meant "few real limits on ... vigorous antiunion activities. ... Reported violations of the NLRA skyrocketed in the late 1970s and early 1980s. Meanwhile, strike rates plummeted, and many of the strikes that did occur were acts of desperation rather than indicators of union muscle."

In neighboring Canada, where the structure of the economy and pro or anti-union sentiment among workers is very similar, unionization was steadier. From 1970 to 2003, union density in the US declined from 23.5 percent to 12.4 percent, while in Canada the loss was much smaller, going from 31.6 percent in 1970 to 28.4 percent in 2003. One difference is that Canadian law allows for card certification and first-contract arbitrations (both features of the proposed Employee Free Choice Act promoted by labor unions in the United States). Canadian law also bans permanent striker replacements, and imposes strong limits on employer propaganda."

According to David Bacon, "Modern unionbusting" employs company-dominated organizations in the workplace to forestall organizing drives.

 History of labor legislation 

Railway Labor Act, 1926
The Railway Labor Act (RLA) of 1926 was the first major piece of labor legislation passed by Congress.  The RLA was amended in 1936 to expand from railroads and cover the emerging airline industry. At UPS, the mechanics, dispatchers, and pilots are the labor groups that are covered by the RLA.  It was enacted because Railroad management wanted to keep the trains moving by putting an end to "wildcat" strikes. Railroad workers wanted to make sure they had an opportunity to organize, be recognized as the exclusive bargaining agent in dealing with a company, negotiate new agreements and enforce existing ones. Under the RLA, agreements do not have expiration dates; instead they have amendable dates which are indicated within the agreement.

Wagner Act, 1935
The National Labor Relations Act (NLRA), often referred to as the Wagner Act, was passed by Congress  July 5, 1935. It established the right to organize unions. The Wagner Act was the most important labor law in American history and earned the nickname "labor's bill of rights". It forbade employers from engaging in five types of labor practices: interfering with or restraining employees exercising their right to organize and bargain collectively; attempting to dominate or influence a labor union; refusing to bargain collectively and in "good faith" with unions representing their employees; and, finally, encouraging or discouraging union membership through any special conditions of employment or through discrimination against union or non-union members in hiring. Before the law, employers had liberty to spy upon, question, punish, blacklist, and fire union members. In the 1930s workers began to organize in large numbers. A great wave of work stoppages in 1933 and 1934 included citywide general strikes and factory occupations by workers. Hostile skirmishes erupted between workers bent on organizing unions, and the police and hired security squads backing the interests of factory owners who opposed unions. Some historians maintain that Congress enacted the NLRA primarily to help stave off even more serious—potentially revolutionary—labor unrest. Arriving at a time when organized labor had nearly lost faith in Roosevelt, the Wagner Act required employers to acknowledge labor unions that were favored by a majority of their work forces. The Act established the National Labor Relations Board (NLRB), with oversight over union elections and unfair labor practices by employers.

Taft–Hartley Act, 1947
The Taft–Hartley Act was a major revision of the National Labor Relations Act of 1935 (the Wagner Act) and represented the first major revision of a New Deal act passed by a post-war Congress. In the mid-term elections of 1946, the Republican Party gained majorities in both houses for the first time since 1931. With the Truman administration initially taking no stand on the bill, it passed both houses with strong bipartisan support. In addition to overwhelming Republican support, a clear majority of House Democrats voted for the bill, while Democrats in the Senate split evenly, 21–21.

The Taft–Hartley Act was vehemently denounced by union officials, who dubbed it a "slave labor" bill. Truman vetoed the bill with a strong message to Congress, but despite Truman's all-out effort to stop the veto override, On June 23, 1947, Congress overrode his veto with considerable Democratic support, including 106 out of 177 Democrats in the House, and 20 out of 42 Democrats in the Senate. However, twenty-eight Democratic members of Congress declared it a "new guarantee of industrial slavery".

Taft–Hartley gave the National Labor Relations Board the power to act against unions engaged in unfair labor practices; previously, the board could only consider unfair practices by employers. It defined specific employer rights which broadened an employer's options during union organizing drives. It banned the closed shop, in which union membership is a precondition of employment at an organized workplace. It allowed state "right to work" laws which prohibit mandatory union dues.

The act required union officials to swear that they were not communists. This provision was overturned by the Supreme Court in 1965.

The act gave the president the power to petition the courts to end a strike if it constitutes a national emergency. Presidents have invoked the Taft–Hartley Act thirty-five times to halt work stoppages in labor disputes; almost all of the instances took place in the late 1940s, 1950s and 1960s, under presidents Truman, Eisenhower, Kennedy, and Johnson, after which the provision fell into disuse. The last two times the emergency provision was invoked were in 1978 by Jimmy Carter and 2002 by George W. Bush.

Landrum–Griffin Act, 1959
The Landrum–Griffin Act of 1959 is also known as the Labor Management Reporting and Disclosure Act (LMRDA) defined financial reporting requirements for both unions and management organizations. Pursuant to LMRDA Section 203(b) employers are required to disclose the costs of any persuader activity as it regards consultants and potential bargaining unit employees.

Martin J. Levitt's interpretation is as follows:
The law regulates labor unions' internal affairs and union officials' relationships with employers. But the law also required companies to report certain expenditures related to their anti-union activities. Fortunately for union busters, loopholes in the requirements allow management and their agents to ignore the provisions aimed at reforming their behavior. The loopholes require consultants to file if they communicate with employees either for the purpose of persuading them not to join a union, or to gain knowledge about the employees or the union that may be passed on to the employer. However, most consultants accomplish these goals by indirect means, using supervisors and management as their first line of contact with employees. Even before the Act was passed, labor consultants had identified front-line supervisors as the most effective lobbyists for management.

Landrum–Griffin also seeks to prevent consultants from spying on employees or the union. Information is not to be compiled unless it is for the purpose of a specific legal proceeding.  ccording to Martin Levitt, "It is easy for consultants to use this provision as a cover for "all kinds of information gathering".

According to Levitt, "because of Landrum–Griffin's vague language, attorneys are able to directly interfere in the union-organizing process without any reporting requirements. Therefore, "young lawyers run bold anti-union wars and dance all over Landrum–Griffin." The provisions of Landrum–Griffin allowing special rights for lawyers resulted in labor consultants working under the shield of labor attorneys, allowing them to easily evade the intent of the law."

Levitt stated:

See also

 Anti-union violence in the United States
 Anti-union violence
 Union busting
 Grabow Riot
 Labor spies
 Mohawk Valley formula
 Strike breaking
 Trade union
 Union Organizer
 Union threat model
 Union wage premium
 Salt (union organizing)
 Martin J. Levitt

Notes

References

 Further reading 
 Levitt, Marty. 1993. Confessions of a Union Buster. New York: Random House.
 Smith, Robert Michael. 2003. From Blackjacks to Briefcases: A History of Commercialized Strikebreaking and Union busting in the United States. Athens, Ohio: Ohio University Press.
 Reik, Millie.  2005. "Labor Relations (Major Issues in American History). Greenwood Press, 
 Norwood, Stephen H. 2003. "Strikebreaking and Intimidation: Mercenaries and Masculinity in Twentieth-Century America".  

External links
 Repression Against the IWW
 2011 Crackdown on Organized Labor: States Urge Laws to Curb Union Influence - video report by Democracy Now!''

History of labor relations in the United States
Political repression in the United States

Union busting
History of the Industrial Workers of the World

id:Pemberangusan serikat pekerja